The Enactus World Cup, or the Enactus, is an international social entrepreneurship project presentation competition for university students organized by Enactus, an international non-profit organisation based in Springfield, Missouri. The championship is held annually since 1975 after being established by Texas attorney Robert T. Davis, initially named as Students in Free Enterprise or SIFE. Currently, there are 33 countries who participate in the competition. Al-Azhar University from Egypt won 2020's contest. Because of the COVID-19 pandemic, the 2021 edition of the competition was held virtually, with the winner being October 6 University of Egypt. The 2022 Enactus World Cup will be held October 30 - November 2, 2022, in Puerto Rico.

History 
The organization was founded in 1975 in the United States as a project of the National Leadership Institute under the name Students In Free Enterprise or SIFE. The aim was to get students excited about the free market economy and to immerse them to the role of entrepreneurs and companies within the market economy. The initiative was initially only active in the USA, where the number of participating teams and students grew steadily. In 1995, exchange students from the University of Nebraska-Lincoln laid the foundation for global expansion when they returned from the US to their home countries. In October 2012 the organization was renamed Enactus after a member survey by the board. 

Alvin Rohrs served as CEO for 30 years until 2016, when he was succeeded by Rachael Jarosh who served as CEO until June 2021. Robyn Schryer Fehrman, previously a director at Duke University, became the President and CEO as of September 2021.

In 2021 there were 1,730 Enactus teams at colleges and universities in 35 countries with around 500,000 students.

References 

Entrepreneurship